is the memorial shrine of Tokugawa Ieyasu in Sendai, Miyagi Prefecture, Japan. Five of its buildings, all dating to 1654, have been designated Important Cultural Properties. The torii and gates were damaged in the 2011 Tōhoku earthquake and tsunami.

History
The Sendai Tōshōgū was established by Date Tadamune, the second daimyō of Sendai Domain. Construction began in August 1649, and was completed in March 1654. The shrine served as the tutelary temple of the Date clan during the Edo period. However, with the fall of the Tokugawa shogunate in 1868, the new Meiji government initially closed the shrine. It was soon re-opened due to demands of local townspeople, and under the State Shinto system of shrine ranking from 1879 through 1916, was officially designated as a "county shrine" and from 1916 to 1946 as a "prefectural shrine".

Notable structures
  (1654) (Important Cultural Property)
  (1654) (ICP)
  (1654) (ICP)
  (1654) (ICP)
  (1654) (ICP)

See also
Tōshō-gū
List of Tōshō-gū
 Nikkō Tōshōgū
 Zuihōden
 Entsū-in
 List of Shinto shrines

References

External links

  

Tokugawa clan
Shinto shrines in Miyagi Prefecture
1654 establishments in Japan
Buildings and structures in Sendai
Important Cultural Properties of Japan
Tōshō-gū